The Billabong Pro Tahiti 2014 was an event of the Association of Surfing Professionals for 2014 ASP World Tour.This event was held from 15 to 26 August 2014 and was contested by 36 surfers. The tournament was won by Gabriel Medina (BRA), who beat Kelly Slater (US) in the final.

Round 1

Round 2

Round 3

Round 4

Round 5

Quarter-finals

Semi-finals

Final

References

 Site ASP

Tahiti Pro
2014 in surfing
2014 in French Polynesian sport